Francis K. Lelo is a Kenyan academic, researcher and academic administrator. He is the associate professor of Environmental Studies at Egerton University. He has also served as the vice chancellor Laikipia University and as ag. Prior to that, he was a principal at Kisii University College. He is an expert in community mobilization and is well known for his efforts in environmental conservation.

References

1952 births
Living people
Academic staff of Egerton University
York University alumni
University of Nairobi alumni
Clark University alumni
Kenyan conservationists
Academic staff of Laikipia University